Kalahandi Utsav also called "Kalahandi Utsav Ghumara" is an annual exhibition or festival celebrated along with district administration in Bhawanipatna and Dharamgarh of Kalahandi District in the Indian state of Odisha. Kalahandi Utsav is a platform to encourage, motivate and showcase the art, culture, music, drama, literature, handy crafts of Odisha globally.

History
P.K. Jena, an ex-collector of Kalahandi first initiated the Kalahandi Utsav in 1997. Initially it was called Ghumura Mahotsav. Then it was organized at sub-division level at Dharamgarh by ex-sub-collector V. Karthikeya Pandian in 2003.

Venue
It is celebrated at Lal Bahadur stadium in Bhawanipatna and Panchayat playground in Dharamgarh. More than 300 stalls appear at both venues.

Performances
Hundreds of folk dance troupes and folk singers from different parts of the State and outside perform.

Preparation
Mahavir Sanskruti Anusthan,a Cultural organization based in Bhawanipatna trains local performers of Kalahandi district.

Gallery

References

Kalahandi district
Festivals in Odisha